Max Kaltenberger (born 8 February 1941) is an Austrian bobsledder. He competed in the two-man event at the 1968 Winter Olympics.

References

1941 births
Living people
Austrian male bobsledders
Olympic bobsledders of Austria
Bobsledders at the 1968 Winter Olympics
Sportspeople from Vienna